Cedar Brush Creek is a suburb of the Central Coast region of New South Wales, Australia, located  upstream from Wyong along the Wyong River. It is part of the  local government area.

The first permanent resident was William Beaven who was also the first person buried at St Barnabas Church Yarramalong.

References

Suburbs of the Central Coast (New South Wales)